The 2006 J&S Cup was a Tier II event on the 2006 WTA Tour that run from May 1–7, 2006. It was held in Warsaw, Poland, and was the 11th year that the event was staged. Kim Clijsters won her first Warsaw title and first overall of the year.

Entrants

Seeds

 Seedings are based on the rankings of April 24, 2006.
 Anna-Lena Grönefeld No. 8 seed withdrew due to left hamstring strain, so Daniela Hantuchová become No. 9 seed

Other entrants
The following players received wildcards into the main draw:

  Agnieszka Radwańska
  Urszula Radwańska

The following players received entry from the qualifying draw:

  Emmanuelle Gagliardi
  Tatiana Perebiynis
  Julia Vakulenko
  Galina Voskoboeva

The following players received entry as lucky losers:

  Tsvetana Pironkova

Finals

Singles

 Kim Clijsters defeated  Svetlana Kuznetsova, 7–5, 6–2

Doubles

 Anastasia Myskina /  Elena Likhovtseva defeated  Anabel Medina Garrigues /  Katarina Srebotnik, 6–3, 6–4

External links
WTA Profile
Singles, Doubles and Qualifying Singles Draws

JandS Cup
Warsaw Open
May 2006 sports events in Europe
War